Linda Gould is an American politician in the New Hampshire House of Representatives. She currently is one of seven elected state representatives for the Hillsborough-7 district (Bedford, New Hampshire). She was elected for the first time in 2014.

Background information 
Before becoming a state representative, Gould was a teacher until 2000, involved with New Hampshire Right to Life and the Bike Walk Alliance of New Hampshire.

References 

Living people
Date of birth missing (living people)
University of New Hampshire alumni
Women state legislators in New Hampshire
Republican Party members of the New Hampshire House of Representatives
Year of birth missing (living people)
21st-century American politicians
21st-century American women politicians